Coralliophila elaborata is a species of sea snail, a marine gastropod mollusk, in the family Muricidae, the murex snails or rock snails.

Distribution
This species occurs in Hawaiian Islands.

References

elaborata
Gastropods described in 1864